Maing Ka  (as the crow flies) is a village in Bhamo Township in Bhamo District in the Kachin State of north-eastern Burma. Kachin's capital Myitkyina is approximately 121 kilometers, or 75 miles, away from Maing Ka. The distance from Maing Ka to Myanmar's capital Nay Pyi Taw is approximately 517 kilometers, or 321 miles.

References

External links
Satellite map at Maplandia.com
Facts and Figures about Maing Ka - Places in the World

Populated places in Kachin State
Bhamo Township